Miloš Bojović (born December 2, 1981) is a Serbian professional basketball player. He is a 1.98 tall guard who currently plays for Limburg United of the Pro Basketball League. In 2018 and 2019, he was the Belgian PBL scoring champion.

External links
 Miloš Bojović at aba-liga.com
 Miloš Bojović at euroleague.com
 Miloš Bojović at eurobasket.com
 Miloš Bojović at fiba.com

1981 births
Living people
Basketball League of Serbia players
Basketball players from Belgrade
BC Politekhnika-Halychyna players
CSU Sibiu players
Guards (basketball)
KK Avala Ada players
KK Beopetrol/Atlas Beograd players
KK Budućnost players
KK Radnički FMP players
KK Sloga players
KK Vojvodina Srbijagas players
KK Železničar Inđija players
Liège Basket players
Limburg United players
Olympique Antibes basketball players
P.A.O.K. BC players
Serbian expatriate basketball people in Belgium
Serbian expatriate basketball people in Greece
Serbian expatriate basketball people in France
Serbian expatriate basketball people in Romania
Serbian expatriate basketball people in Ukraine
Serbian men's basketball players